Eubergioides is a genus of moths in the family Saturniidae first described by Charles Duncan Michener in 1949.

Species
Eubergioides bertha (Schaus, 1896)

References

Hemileucinae